Paralympic powerlifting has been competed at every Summer Paralympics since 1984. Weightlifting had been on the Paralympic program since 1964; however, after the 1992 Games the IPC decided to drop weightlifting and hold powerlifting events only. Women first competed in the sport at the 2000 Sydney Paralympics.

Summary

Paralympic records 
The International Paralympic Committee recognises the heaviest weights lifted in powerlifting events at the Paralympic Games.

Men 
♦ denotes a performance that is also a current world record

Women 
♦ denotes a performance that is also a current world record

Medal summary
Updated to 2020 Summer Paralympics.

Medalists

Men's events 
 48 kg

 49 kg

 52 kg

 54 kg

56 kg

 59 kg

60 kg

 65 kg

67.5

 72 kg

75 kg

 80 kg

82.5

 88 kg

 90 kg

 97 kg

+90 kg

 100 kg

 107 kg

+100 kg

 +107 kg

Women's events 

 40 kg

 41 kg

 44 kg

 45 kg

 48 kg

 50 kg

 52 kg

 55 kg

 56 kg

 60 kg

 61 kg

 67 kg

 67.5

 73 kg

 75 kg

 79 kg

 82.5 kg

 86 kg

 +82.5

 +86 kg

Nations

See also 
Weightlifting at the Summer Olympics
World Para Powerlifting Championships

References

External links
 IPC Historical Results Archive
 Paralympic Records – World Para Powerlifting

 
Sports at the Summer Paralympics
Powerlifting at multi-sport events